Leew Eilun Feer (Fering North Frisian for "Beloved Isle of Föhr") is the insular anthem of Föhr, in the Fering tongue. The lyrics were written by Knud Broder Knudsen (1864–1917).

Lyrics

References

See also
Üüs Söl’ring Lön’

European anthems
North Frisian language
Regional songs
Föhr
German anthems